The King's Bench, or, during the reign of a female monarch, the Queen's Bench, refers to several contemporary and historical courts in some Commonwealth jurisdictions.

 Court of King's Bench (England), a historic court of common law in the English legal system until 1875
 Court of King's Bench (Ireland), a historic senior court of common law in Ireland
 King's Bench Division, a division of the High Court of England and Wales that assumed many of the responsibilities of the historic King's Bench in 1875
 Court of King's Bench of Alberta, the superior trial court of the Canadian province of Alberta
 Court of King's Bench of Manitoba, the superior trial court of the Canadian province of Manitoba
 Court of King's Bench of New Brunswick, the superior trial court of the Canadian province of New Brunswick
 Court of King's Bench for Saskatchewan, the superior trial court of the Canadian province of Saskatchewan
 Court of King's Bench of Quebec, a historical trial court in the British colony of Quebec
 Court of King's Bench of Quebec, the prior name for the present-day Quebec Court of Appeal of pre-Confederation Canada East and modern province of Quebec

See also 
 Court system of Canada
 List of Supreme Court of Judicature cases

Notes